"After the Rain" is a song by Canadian rock band Nickelback. It was released on October 22, 2017 as the fourth and final single from their ninth studio album, Feed the Machine. The song was written by frontman Chad Kroeger with Ali Tamposi, and is Nickelback's second collaboration with Tamposi after the latter had performed backing vocals on "She Keeps Me Up" in 2014.

Background
In an interview with Louder Sound, lead singer Chad Kroeger said about the song's motivational theme "Often times in life I think we lose sight that our most challenging trials and tribulations can also be our most teachable moments. Those very hardships that we encounter aren't really obstacles at all. Rather, they are seeds that if planted properly will bear fruit that we can learn, grow and benefit from to be the very best versions of ourselves that we can be. And that is the message I wanted to get across in 'After the Rain'". 

The band later released an official lyric video for the song on September 20, 2017.

Personnel
Chad Kroeger – lead vocals, guitar
Ryan Peake – guitar, keyboards
Mike Kroeger – bass guitar
Daniel Adair – drums

Charts

References

2017 singles
2017 songs
Nickelback songs
Songs written by Chad Kroeger
Songs written by Ali Tamposi